Laurie A. Boyer is an American biomedical engineer who is a professor at the Massachusetts Institute of Technology. Her research considers embryonic stem cells and cardiac development.

Early life and education 
Boyer is from western Massachusetts. She became interested in science and biology whilst at high school. She was an undergraduate student at Framingham State University where she studied biomedical sciences. She moved to the University of Massachusetts Chan Medical School, where she researched chromatin remodeling enzymes. She earned a doctorate at Saint Louis University, where she investigated safety cultures in the aviation and healthcare sectors. She worked as a postdoctoral research at the MIT Whitehead Institute.

Research and career 
Boyer investigates cardiac development, and how different genes affect heart development. In particular, she has investigated cardiomyocytes and how they repeatedly contract and relax. An overarching question of her research is how cardiomyocytes assemble into their apparatus for contacting. She has studied heart development in people with Trisomy-21, half of whom have heart defects. The most common condition is an Atrioventricular septal defect. Boyer worked with Angelika Amon to identify the faulty signals in Trisomy-21 cardiac cells that can damage heart development.

Awards and honors 
 2006 Scientific American World's 50 Top Leaders in Research, Business or Policy
 2007 Framingham State University Honorary Doctorate
 2008 Pew Scholars Award in the Biomedical Sciences
 2009 Smith Family Award for Excellence in Biomedical Science
 2012 Irvin and Helen Sizer Career Development Award
 2013 American Heart Association Innovative Research Award

Selected publications

References 

Living people
People from Massachusetts
Saint Louis University alumni
Framingham State University alumni
Massachusetts Institute of Technology faculty
American biomedical engineers
American women scientists
Year of birth missing (living people)